The Garden Gang was a series of books for children written by Jayne Fisher. They were published by Ladybird Books during the late 1970s and early 1980s as Series 413 and later re-issued as Series 793. Fourteen story books were written, each containing two short stories about a group of characters who were fruit and vegetables living an almost human life, selling over 8 million copies . In addition to the fourteen story books, there were also three other books - an annual and two colouring books. Fisher's books were not dissimilar to the popular Munch Bunch series, also devised by a young girl, the fourteen-year-old Angela Mitson.

At the age of 9 years, Jayne was the youngest author to ever write for Ladybird Books. Her writing and illustrating has been an inspiration to others.

Books

There are fourteen story books:

 Penelope Strawberry and Roger Radish (1979)
 Percival Pea and Polly Pomegranate (1979)
 Oliver Onion and Tim Tomato (1979)
 Wee Willie Watermelon and Betty Beetroot (1979)
 Lucy Leek and Bertie Brussels Sprout (1979)
 Gertrude Gooseberry and Belinda Blackcurrant (1979)
 Colin Cucumber and Patrick Pear (1980)
 Peter Potato and Alice Apple (1980)
 Pam Parsnip and Lawrence Lemon (1980)
 Grace Grape and Robert Raspberry (1980)
 Sheila Shallot and Benny Broadbean (1980)
 Avril Apricot and Simon Swede (1980)
 Pedro Pepper and The Cherry Twins (1983)
 Oscar Orange and Augustus Aubergine (1983)

A larger and relatively hard-to-find story book (or annual):

 Meet The Garden Gang (1981)

Two colouring books:

 The Garden Gang Have Fun (1979)
 The Garden Gang At Home (1979)

See also

Munch Bunch

References

External links
Jayne Fisher biography
The 400s Series of Ladybird Books

Novel series
British children's books
Series of children's books
Fruit and vegetable characters